Bolivia held a parliamentary elections in May 1912, electing a new National Congress (for half the seats of the Deputies and 1/3 the seats of the Senators).

Results

Elected members
The new senators were: 
Mariano Méndez Roca, (Beni)
David Cronenbold, (Béni)
Cupertino Arteaga, (Chuquisaca)
Benedicto Goytia, (La Paz)
Ángel Menacho, (Santa Cruz)
Adolfo Trigo Achá, (Tarija)

References

Elections in Bolivia
Bolivia
Legislative election
May 1912 events
Election and referendum articles with incomplete results